Rupert of Hentzau is an 1898 novel by Anthony Hope, the sequel to The Prisoner of Zenda.

Rupert of Hentzau may also refer to:

Rupert of Hentzau (1915 film), directed by George Loane Tucker
Rupert of Hentzau (1923 film), directed by Victor Heerman
Rupert of Hentzau (TV series), 1964 British series directed by Gerald Blake

See also
Rupert (disambiguation)